Irakli Tsirekidze (born 3 May 1982) is a Georgian judoka.

On September 15, 2007, he won a gold medal at world judo championship beating Greek Ilias Iliadis by yuko.

At 2008 Summer Olympics, he won a gold medal with beating Algerian Amar Benikhlef in the final.

He became head coach of the Georgian National Judo Team after the Rio 2016 Summer Olympics.

Achievements

References

External links
 
 Videos of Irakli Tsirekidze (judovision.org)

1982 births
Male judoka from Georgia (country)
Judoka at the 2008 Summer Olympics
Olympic judoka of Georgia (country)
Olympic gold medalists for Georgia (country)
Living people
Olympic medalists in judo
World judo champions
Medalists at the 2008 Summer Olympics
Recipients of the Presidential Order of Excellence